James Calthorpe (1604 – 19 April 1652) of East Barsham Norfolk, was a Sheriff of Norfolk in 1643.

Family
Around 1627 Calthorpe married firstly Mary (c.1612–1640), daughter of William Fermor and Anne, daughter of Robert Brooke. All their children died before she did.

Calthorpe married secondly Katherine (1616-1677), daughter of Sir Edward Lewknor (died 1618) and Mary Neville. They had a son Christopher Calthorpe (died 1718), (who became a Knight of the Bath and married Dorothy, daughter of Sir William Spring); and two daughters Elizabeth and Ann (who married Sir Thomas Le Strang).

Notes

References
 
 
 

1604 births
1652 deaths
High Sheriffs of Norfolk
People from North Norfolk (district)